Donnchad Ó Flaithbertaig (also known as Donatus) was Bishop of Killala. Elected on 16 April 1281, he was consecrated on 29 September 1281. He died in February 1306.

References

13th-century Roman Catholic bishops in Ireland
14th-century Roman Catholic bishops in Ireland
Medieval Gaels from Ireland
Bishops of Killala
Religious leaders from County Mayo
People from County Galway